St. John's Church is a church in Delvinë District, Albania. It is a Cultural Monument of Albania.

References

Cultural Monuments of Albania
Buildings and structures in Delvinë
Churches in Vlorë County